Rose Mary Allen (born 1950) is a Curaçaoan anthropologist, who has published on the oral history of former enslaved people of the Dutch Caribbean islands. Her dissertation, "Di ki manera: a social history of Afro-Curaçaoans, 1863-1917" draws largely on the collected oral histories of Afro-Curaçaoans. She holds a PhD and is a lecturer at the University of Curaçao.

In 2015 she was awarded a knighthood in the Order of Orange-Nassau by the Netherlands and she also won the Cola Debrot Prize.

Sources and references

Living people
1950 births
Dutch women anthropologists
20th-century anthropologists
21st-century anthropologists
Academic staff of the University of Curaçao
Dutch anthropologists